Bhagwanpura, also known as Baghpur, is a village in  Kurukshetra district, Haryana, India. It is an archaeological site that lies on the bank of Hakra Ghaggar channel. Situated 24 km northeast of Kurukshetra, the site is notable for showing an overlap between the late Harappan and Painted Grey Ware cultures. Painted Grey Ware is generally associated with the Vedic people, so this area can be said as the junction of two great civilizations of India.

An archaeological museum at Sheikh Chilli's Tomb complex in Kurukshetra established by the Archaeological Survey of India consists of archaeological finds like a humped bull-shaped carnelian pendant, terracotta beads and semi-precious stones from sites in Bhagwanpura.

Overview

Bhagwanpura shows one period of habitation, with two sub-periods:
Sub-period IA: late Harappan culture (c. 1700–1300 BCE)
Sub-period IB: overlap between late Harappan and PGW culture (c. 1400–1000 BCE)

During sub-period IA, the late Harappan people lived in houses of burnt brick and built mud platforms to protect against flooding. During sub-period IB, the late Harappan pottery continued, but a new form of pottery (the PGW) was introduced. Initially, the PGW people lived in thatched wattle-and-daub huts, but later they began to build mud-walled houses. One large house had thirteen rooms and a courtyard, and may have belonged to a chief. Towards the end of sub-period IB, the PGW people began to use burnt bricks, but no complete structures have been found. During both phases, cattle, sheep, and pig were domesticated, but horse bones have only been found in sub-period IB. Six oval structures from this sub-period may have had some ritualistic use.

Some scholars believe that the burnt bricks (square, rectangular, and wedge-shaped) from sub-period IB were not in fact used for building houses, but for the construction of Vedic fire altars.

See also
Indus Valley Civilisation
Painted Grey Ware culture
Vedic period
Kuru Kingdom

References

Indus Valley civilisation sites
Archaeological sites in Haryana
Sarasvati River
Indo-Aryan archaeological sites